The Trio-Twister 203 is a German powered parachute that was designed by Siegfried Stolle and produced by Trio-Twister of Eichwalde. Now out of production, when it was available the aircraft was supplied as a complete ready-to-fly-aircraft.

The aircraft was introduced in 2005 and production ended when the company went out of business later in 2005.

Design and development
It carries a German DULV certification. It features a parachute-style wing, two-place accommodation in side-by-side configuration, tricycle landing gear and one  two cylinder, two-stroke, air-cooled Hirth 3202 aircraft engine mounted in pusher configuration.

The aircraft carriage is a simple frame design with a central canopy attachment, built from bolted aluminium tubing. In flight steering is accomplished via foot pedals that actuate the canopy brakes, creating roll and yaw. On the ground the aircraft has nosewheel steering. The main landing gear incorporates spring rod suspension. The design employs a tilting bench seat to allow the pilot and passenger to see up and backwards to ensure that canopy inflates correctly.

Specifications (Trio-Twister 203)

See also
Trio-Twister 103

References

External links
Company website archives on Archive.org

203
2000s German sport aircraft
2000s German ultralight aircraft
Single-engined pusher aircraft
Powered parachutes